Euro Truck Simulator (known as Big Rig Europe in North America) is a 2008 truck simulation game developed and published by SCS Software, set in Europe. The player can drive a variety of semi-trucks and trailers across a depiction of Europe, visiting the continent's cities, picking up and delivering cargo for various companies. More than 300,000 copies of the game have been sold in Europe. It is the first instalment in the Truck Simulator series of games.

Gameplay 
Euro Truck Simulator features a realistic experience for driving trucks around Europe. The player has to deliver goods around Europe while obeying street signs, highway rules and managing their fuel levels. Euro Truck Simulator has different truck models from different real companies. Each truck has its own engine power, tires and size that effect driving. The game doesn't feature an ending and allows players to continue after having completed all objectives.

Trucks

The game features European truck models with working instruments such as flashing indicators, temperature and low fuel warning lights, wipers, and gauges. The trucks included are the Mercedes-Benz Actros (known as Majestic), the Renault Magnum (known as Runner), the Scania R-series (known as Swift) and the Volvo FH16 (known as Valiant).

Reception

The game received mostly positive reviews from critics at the time of its release. Reviewers highlighted the game's good graphics, the game world and a "satisfying driving experience". They also mentioned the long driving times and repetitive gameplay as uninteresting for those not fans of transportation simulators.

User scores on Metacritic, Steam and GameSpot indicate more favourable opinions from customers than initial reviews suggested.

See also
 Truck Simulator series
 Euro Truck Simulator 2

References

External links
 

2008 video games
MacOS games
SCS Software games
Video games developed in the Czech Republic
Video games set in Austria
Video games set in Belgium
Video games set in France
Video games set in Germany
Video games set in Italy
Video games set in Poland
Video games set in Portugal
Video games set in Spain
Video games set in Switzerland
Video games set in the Czech Republic
Video games set in the Netherlands
Video games set in the United Kingdom
Windows games
Truck simulation video games
Single-player video games
Meridian4 games